Vikram Vedha is a 2022 Indian Hindi-language neo-noir action thriller film written and directed by Pushkar–Gayathri and jointly produced by YNOT Studios, Friday Filmworks, Reliance Entertainment, T-Series Films, Jio Studios and Theme Studios. A remake of the duo's 2017 Tamil film of the same name, it is inspired by the Indian folktale Baital Pachisi and stars Saif Ali Khan and Hrithik Roshan. Radhika Apte, Rohit Saraf and Yogita Bihani play supporting roles. In the film, a police officer sets out to track down and kill a dreaded gangster.

Production began in October 2021 and was wrapped up in June 2022. The film was theatrically released worldwide on 30 September 2022 and received positive reviews from critics and audience, with praise directed towards the direction, cinematography, screenplay, background score and the performances (particularly Roshan and Khan), but underperformed commercially.

Plot 
SSP Vikram is an honest police officer, who has a black-and-white sense of good and evil. Vedha is a dreaded gangster from Kanpur who understands the nuance in between. Vikram's best friend SSP Abbas leads an encounter unit in the STF, which is formed to eliminate Vedha. In one encounter, the squad kills some of Vedha's henchmen, framing an unarmed criminal killed by Vikram to avoid further inquiry. As the unit plans another encounter, Vedha enters the police station and voluntarily surrenders. When Vikram interrogates Vedha, he offers to narrate a story to him. The first act relates about Vedha becoming a dreaded gangster, who warns his younger brother Shatak, who is a mathematical genius, to stay away from crime, but Shatak is forced by a rival gangster, Babloo to carry drugs. When Shatak and his friend Chanda are caught by the police, Shatak confesses and Babloo is arrested.

On his boss Shiv Prasad's orders, Babloo assaults Shatak, leaving a permanent scar on his hand. Vedha asks Vikram if he should kill Babloo or Shiv Prasad. Vikram replies that Shiv Prasad was the real culprit, to which Vedha implies that he killed Shiv Prasad. Vedha's lawyer, who turns out to be Vikram's wife Priya, intervenes and bails him out. Vikram realises that the unarmed criminal framed by them for avoiding inquiry was actually Shatak, based on the mark in his hand. Worried that Vedha might try to kill Abbas, Vikram rushes to save Abbas, but finds him and Chanda shot dead. The IG dismisses it as a botched encounter. Priya refuses to divulge Vedha's whereabouts to Vikram. Enraged by this, Vikram raids Vedha's tenements and manages to capture him. Vedha requests Vikram to listen to another story.

The second act relates with Shatak now grown-up, offering to launder Vedha's income by investing it in shares. Vedha's boss Parshuram Pandey invests  in this venture. However, Chanda is supposedly kidnapped and the money is missing. Chanda returns and reveals that she stole the money to start a new life, but came back because she loves Shatak. Vedha returns the money to Pandey, who orders him to kill Chanda. Vedha asks Vikram if he should respect Pandey and carry out the order or disobey him and support Shatak and Chanda, thus inciting a gang war. Vikram replies that he should support Shatak to which Vedha agrees. Realizing Shatak's innocence causes Vikram to stumble momentarily, at which point Vedha attacks and subdues him, telling him to investigate Shatak's and Abbas's deaths.

Vikram begins his investigation with Abbas's informant, who led them to Shatak's hideout, but finds that the informant has been killed. He and his unit tries to find the killer. Vikram takes a moment to recollect when he finds the leader of the Mumbai Gang from Vedha's story. He apprehends and fights him only for the gang leader to almost kill Vikram before getting shot and killed by his unit member Deepak. Vikram searches his room, but finds a cigar where he finds that the cigarette is filled with marijuana instead of tobacco. Vikram deduces that Babloo is behind the encounter and informs Vedha at his restaurant, who brings Babloo to an abandoned factory. Vikram arrives and meets Vedha, who tells the third and final act to Vikram. Vedha had sent Shatak and Chanda to Mumbai. He noticed that only his men, except Pandey's are being targeted and eliminated by the cops.

On Babloo's confession, Vedha tells that Abbas was bribed by Babloo to kill his men, where he asks Vikram if Abbas was right, since he became corrupt to pay for his son's medical procedure. Vedha kills Babloo leaving Vikram frustrated on finding out who had killed Abbas. The IG and the unit arrive, who castigates Vikram for letting Vedha escape again. Vikram slowly realises that the entire unit had also been bribed by Babloo. IG reveals that Babloo paid them to kill Vedha and Chanda's abduction was intended to lure Shatak out of Mumbai, which would lure Vedha out of hiding. However, a guilt-ridden Abbas had gone to save Chanda, but the unit had killed them both. As the unit prepares to kill Vikram, Vedha reappears and saves him. A gunfight ensues, and Vikram disables all his colleagues with Vedha's help, but kills the IG. Vikram asks Vedha if he should let him go for saving his life or kill him since he is a criminal where a standoff ensues between Vikram and Vedha.

Cast

Production

Development 
In March 2018, Pushkar–Gayathri were confirmed to be directing a Hindi remake of their Tamil film Vikram Vedha (2017), to be produced again by YNOT Studios. The project is co-produced by Friday Filmworks, T-Series Films and Reliance Entertainment, and Neeraj Pandey serves creative producer. Pushkar–Gayathri intended for the remake to maintain the "gritty" tone that the original film had. Although Pandey had previously avoided working on remakes because of his preference to write original material, he was interested in working on this project because of its parallels to Vikramaditya and Betal from the folktale collection Baital Pachisi, which he felt was not yet done in Hindi cinema.

Casting 
Shah Rukh Khan was approached for the film, but declined. In August 2019, it was confirmed that Saif Ali Khan and Aamir Khan would play the police inspector Vikram and the gangster Vedha respectively. Saif differentiated Vikram from Sartaj Singh, another police officer he played in the streaming television series Sacred Games, saying Vikram is "much more dynamic, confident and strong" than Singh who was suicidal, and constantly picked on by others. Pushkar–Gayathri revealed that they were unable to have R. Madhavan reprise his role of Vikram from the original, due to his commitments to Rocketry: The Nambi Effect (2022).

After production delays due to the COVID-19 pandemic during which the writers also re-worked the script, Aamir left the project in December 2020 and was shortly thereafter replaced by Hrithik Roshan. This would mark the second time Saif and Roshan share screen space after Na Tum Jaano Na Hum (2002). As Vedha is from Kanpur, Roshan decided to speak with an Awadhi accent. In July, Radhika Apte was cast as Vikram's lawyer wife and Rohit Saraf signed on to play Vedha's brother the following month. By November 2021, Sharib Hashmi was confirmed to be in the film as Babloo. In March 2022, Yogita Bihani was chosen to play Chanda.

Filming 
Principal photography was planned to begin in February 2021, when Aamir Khan was in the cast. After Roshan replaced him, it was to have begun in June 2021, but ultimately began on 15 October that year with the first schedule taking place in Abu Dhabi, United Arab Emirates (UAE). Before the schedule began, part of the sets originally built for Tiger Zinda Hai (2017) were reworked by Vikram Vedhas crew to resemble Lucknow and Kanpur. In response to reports that Roshan refused to shoot in Lucknow and asked the crew to create the Lucknow sets in Abu Dhabi, causing the budget to escalate, Reliance explained that UAE was "the only location providing the infrastructure for a bio-bubble that accommodated crew of such scale, also allowing building of sets in a studio during the preceding months of the shoot", and the film was shot there due to "health and protocol concerns". They added that their films' shooting locations and budgetary decisions are not controlled by actors. After the Abu Dhabi schedule ended within 27 working days, the second schedule began in Lucknow in early December. Saif Ali Khan finished his portions of the schedule by the end of the month. Apte, whose schedule was only 10 days, finished filming most of her portions by 26 April 2022. Filming wrapped by 10 June 2022.

Music 

The songs featured in the film are composed by Vishal–Shekhar and Sam C. S., the latter who scored the original Tamil film. The film score too is composed by Sam. The first single "Alcoholia" was released on 17 September 2022, and the second single "Bande" on 26 September 2022. The songs "Alcoholia" and "Oo Saahiba" are arranged and produced by music producer Meghdeep Bose.

Marketing 
The film's teaser trailer was released on 24 August 2022. On YouTube, it received over one million likes in less than 24 hours, surpassing War (2019) as the most-liked teaser for a Hindi film.

Release 
Vikram Vedha was theatrically released worldwide on 30 September 2022, during the Navratri, Gandhi Jayanti and pre-Dussehra occasions. Ahead of the release, Reliance Entertainment obtained a wide-ranging injunction from the Madras High Court to protect the film's copyright. Indian internet service providers were ordered by the court to preemptively block over 13,000 websites that Reliance believed were likely to host illegal copies of the film based on their histories of "non-compliant" operations, even before it was publicly released.

Reception

Box office 

Critical response

India 
Vikram Vedha received positive reviews from critics and audience.

Bollywood Hungama rated the film 4 out of 5 stars and wrote "Vikram Vedha is a brilliant massy fare that works due to the strong writing, unpredictable moments, Hrithik Roshan and Saif Ali Khan's outstanding performances and the electrifying background score". Sanchita Jhunjhunwala of Times Now rated the film 4 out of 5 stars and wrote "There are ample of highs in the movie, including the narrative that builds up, the setting that the makers have put together, and the so many characters involved. The film boasts of some absolutely mind-blowing shots, and due credits to the director duo for the same". Tushar Joshi of India Today rated the film 3.5 out of 5 stars and wrote "Vikram Vedha is unapologetically massy. It's also a lot of fun, and with two rock-solid performers like Hrithik and Saif". Rachana Dubey of The Times of India rated the film 3.5 out of 5 stars and wrote "Hrithik is menacing, ruthless and extremely emotional in parts. Pushkar-Gayathri, have pretty much stuck to the blue-print they created for the original, It's a plus that they haven't changed the roadmap too much". Dishya Sharma of News18 rated the film 3.5 out of 5 stars and wrote "Vikram Vedha is a massy film that serves as a fun single-screen theatre experience. I'd suggest caving into Pushkar and Gayathri's make-believe world and joining Vikram and Vedha's cat and mouse chase". Mugdha Kapoor of DNA India rated the film 3.5 out of 5 stars and wrote "Hrithik Roshan and Saif Ali Khan exude a level of comfort that only two very secure actors could portray onscreen". Devesh Sharma of Filmfare rated the film 3.5 out of 5 stars and wrote "Watch the film for its stylised action scenes. The Parkour sequence involving Hrithik is action choreography at its imaginative best. And also for the rock solid performances by both Saif Ali Khan and Hrithik Roshan".

Sukanya Verma of Rediff.com rated the film 3.5 out of 5 stars and wrote "A screenplay and superstar in perfect tandem, it doesn't get better than this". Ritika Handoo of Zee News rated the film 3.5 out of 5 stars and wrote "A mass entertainer, the film shows some sturdy technical work, especially the pithy camerawork. The lines between right and wrong blur in the film, so the cinematographer P.S. Vinod effectively brings out the essence of Kanpur and Lucknow as he holds the pulse of the leading lines in his frames". Stutee Ghosh of The Quint rated the film 3.5 out of 5 stars and wrote "Hritik and Saif seem to be really enjoying themselves. It's their self-assured presence that keeps us hooked even when the pacing falters or the film seems too stretched for its own good". Mahpara Kabir of ABP News rated the film 3.5 out of 5 stars and wrote "Vikram Vedha is a complete masala entertainer with apt amount of action, drama and thought-provoking introspection. Thriving in high-octane action, it's a delight to watch Hrithik Roshan and Saif Ali Khan on the big screen after a long time. The film loaded with power-packed performance by two of the most suave looking actors". Sanyukta Thakare of Mashable rated the film 3.5 out of 5 stars and wrote "Vikram Vedha is certainly the watch for this week, with a rare balance of visuals, story and performances".

Bharathi Pradhan of Lehren rated the film 3.5 out of 5 stars and termed the film as "double victory". "In which one is the compelling performances of Saif and Hrithik. The second is the unique, layered style of the husband-and-wife duo, awesomeness in the visuals and in the action, played out with a signature background score". Prateek Sur of Outlook rated the film 3.5 out of 5 stars and wrote "They've not tried to ape, but stayed true to the original and given the entertainment quotient the highest priority. It may have a few shortcomings with its length and music-choreography, but otherwise, it's a solid film". Shubhra Gupta of The Indian Express rated the film 3 out of 5 stars and wrote "After a long time, two top-flight stars such as Hrithik Roshan and Saif Ali Khan sink their teeth into a proper story which comes before them". Abhimanyu Mathur of Hindustan Times stated "Vikram Vedha works as both a thriller and a masala action flick. It is enjoyable and even manages a few whistles and claps in a packed hall". Saibal Chatterjee of NDTV rated the film 3 out of 5 stars and wrote "Saif Ali Khan makes a far better Vikram. Hrithik Roshan harnesses his star appeal and screen presence to deliver the goods". R Krishnakumar of Deccan Herald rated the film 3 out of 5 stars and wrote "Vikram Vedha needed some more of that kind of inspired madness to take it beyond what it ends up as: an almost satisfactory, risk-free remake". Anna M. M. Vetticad of Firstpost rated the film 2.5 out of 5 stars and wrote "This Hindi Vikram Vedha retains the swag of the Tamil original, but some minor changes in it are curious in what they reveal about the team's assessment of north Indian viewers".

International 
Manjusha Radhakrishnan of Gulf News rated the film 3.5 out of 5 stars and termed it as a "hero-laden visual spectacle".

Notes

References

External links 
 

2020s Hindi-language films
2020s police procedural films
2022 action thriller films
2022 crime action films
2022 crime thriller films
2022 films
Films about organised crime in India
Films based on fairy tales
Films based on fantasy works
Films based on Indian folklore
Films directed by Pushkar–Gayathri
Films scored by Sam C. S.
Films scored by Vishal–Shekhar
Hindi remakes of Tamil films
Indian action thriller films
Indian crime action films
Indian crime thriller films
Indian gangster films
Indian neo-noir films
Films shot in Abu Dhabi